Eufidonia notataria, the powder moth, is a species of moth in the family Geometridae. It is found in north-eastern North America.

The wingspan is 22–27 mm. Adults are on wing from May to July. There is one generation per year.

The larvae feed on balsam fir, eastern hemlock, eastern larch and spruces.

External links
Bug Guide
Caterpillars of Eastern Forests
Moth Guide
Larval Stage info

Melanolophiini
Moths described in 1860